The ' Devel Sixteen is a prototype hypercar designed in the United Arab Emirates by Devel Motors.

In June 2022, one Sixteen with a V8 engine was made, but its performance is not yet confirmed.

See also
 SRT Tomahawk, a concept car with similar power and model variants.

References 

Sports cars
Upcoming car models